Median regression may refer to:

 Quantile regression, a regression analysis used to estimate conditional quantiles such as the median
 Repeated median regression, an algorithm for robust linear regression